The Crown Colony of Sarawak competed at the 1962 British Empire and Commonwealth Games in Perth, Western Australia, from 22 November to 1 December 1962.

Athletics

Men
Track events

Field events

References

1962
Nations at the 1962 British Empire and Commonwealth Games
1962 in Sarawak